Ralph Izard (January 23, 1741/1742May 30, 1804) was a U.S. politician. He served as President pro tempore of the United States Senate in 1794,

Early life
Izard was born at "The Elms" near Charleston, South Carolina. He was the son of Henry Izard and Margaret Johnson. His great-grandfather was Ralph Izard (1660–1710), who was born in Dorchester, England and settled in South Carolina.  His maternal grandfather was Province of South Carolina Governor Robert Johnson.  Izard's parents died when he was a small child, and only one of his siblings survived to adulthood.

He spent most of his childhood and youth studying in England: he attended a school in Hackney, London, and matriculated as a fellow-commoner at Trinity Hall, Cambridge. Izard returned to America in 1764, but did not remain in South Carolina for long. He was elected the American Society (later the American Philosophical Society) in 1768.

Career
He resided in London in 1771 and moved to Paris, France, in 1776. He was appointed commissioner to the Court of Tuscany by the Continental Congress in 1776, but was recalled in 1779. He returned to America in 1780 and pledged his large estate in South Carolina for the payment of war ships to be used in the American Revolutionary War. He was a member of the Continental Congress in 1782 and 1783. In 1788, he was elected to the United States Senate and served from March 4, 1789, to March 4, 1795, serving as President pro tempore of the Senate during the Third Congress.

Later life
Izard was one of the founders of the College of Charleston. Izard retired from public life to the care of his estates in 1795. Within two years of his retirement, he was stricken with an untreatable illness that paralyzed him on one side of his body.

Death and legacy

In 1767, Izard married Alice De Lancey, who was a niece of James DeLancey and a descendant of Stephanus Van Cortlandt and Gertrude Schuyler.  After Izard moved to America in 1780 to focus on his work towards the American Revolution, his family stayed in France until 1783 when they joined him in South Carolina. Izard and his wife had fourteen children together, but only seven survived past early childhood, including:

 Ralph Izard, was a naval hero of Tripoli.  The World War II USS Izard was named after him. In 1808, Izard married Eliza Pinckney, daughter of Major General Charles Cotesworth Pinckney, a signer of the Constitution, and a granddaughter of Colonel Charles Pinckney, chief justice of South Carolina. Ralph's wife was also a niece of Arthur Middleton.
 Major General George Izard, was a governor of Arkansas.
 Anne Izard, who married William Allan Deas {1764-1863} with whom they had a son, the painter, Charles Deas. William's brother was Col. James Sutherland Deas {1784-1864} who was the father of CS General Zachariah Cantey Deas
 Charlotte Izard, who married William Loughton Smith, a son of S.C. Assemblyman Benjamin Smith; William L. Smith was also a brother-in-law of South Carolina Congressman Isaac Motte.

Izard died near Charleston on May 30, 1804, at the age of sixty-two.  He is interred in the churchyard of St. James Goose Creek Episcopal Church, near Charleston. 

Izard was a slaveholder.

Descendants
A great-grandson of Ralph Izard was Charles Manigault Morris who was also a great-grandson of Lewis Morris. A cousin of Charles Manigault Morris was General Arthur Middleton Manigault who was descended from Mary Izard-cousin of Ralph Izard.

A cousin Sarah Izard married South Carolina Loyalist Governor Lord William Campbell. A cousin twice removed was Elizabeth {Eliza} Izard who was a daughter-in-law of Congressman of South Carolina Thomas Pinckney. One niece Elizabeth Izard married Alexander Wright (1751–?), a son of Loyalist Governor of Georgia James Wright (governor).

References

External links

1740s births
1804 deaths
Continental Congressmen from South Carolina
18th-century American politicians
United States senators from South Carolina
Presidents pro tempore of the United States Senate
American people of English descent
American planters
American slave owners
People of South Carolina in the American Revolution
Huguenot participants in the American Revolution
Alumni of Trinity Hall, Cambridge